The Jaramillo normal event is a period of normal polarity of Earth's magnetic field during the Matumaya Reversed Epoch.  The Jaramillo normal event is dated to 1.06 to 0.9 million years ago in the stratigraphic record of Pleistocene epoch rocks found near Jaramillo Creek in the Valles Caldera of New Mexico.

See also 
Jaramillo reversal

References

Pleistocene events